The 1993 Island Games were the fifth Island Games, and were held on the Isle of Wight, from July 3 to July 10, 1993.

Medal table

Sports
The sports chosen for the games were:

External links
 1993 Island Games

Island Games
Sport on the Isle of Wight
Island Games, 1993
Island Games
Multi-sport events in the United Kingdom
20th century on the Isle of Wight
July 1993 sports events in the United Kingdom